Yury Muzychenka (born 31 January 2000) is a Belarusian footballer who plays for Lokomotiv Gomel.

References

External links

2000 births
Living people
People from Dobruš District
Sportspeople from Gomel Region
Belarusian footballers
Association football forwards
FC Gomel players
FC Sputnik Rechitsa players
FC Vitebsk players
FC Lokomotiv Gomel players